Fīnau Ulukālala (Hot Headed) was a dynasty of six important hereditary chiefs from Vavau (the Tui Vavau), currently in the kingdom of Tonga. The dynasty began sometime in the 18th century and died out in 1960. The chief's original estate was Tuanuku, and his nickname and that of the village is Tavakefaiana (a species of tropicbird).

Holders of the title

I (i Maofanga)
Although the first Fīnau (Ulukālala I's grandfather, Mataelehaamea), had been a Tui Kanokupolu (at that time, around 1650, the most powerful royal dynasty of Tongatapu), his father Tuituiohu was only a younger brother of Maafuotuitonga, the next Tui Kanokupolu. As such Tuituiohu tried his luck in Vavau, where he started the dynasty of the Haa Ngatatupu.

This first Fīnau died in 1797 in Maufanga, Tongatapu and is therefore also called Fīnau Ulukālala I i Maofanga (the old form of the name of the village). He was succeeded by his eldest son who would die later in Feletoa, Vavau, and as such is sometimes known as Fīnau Ulukālala II i Feletoa, or by his second name: Fangupō.

Feletoa
At the end of the 18th century, due to the unpopularity of the then incumbent Tui Kanokupolu, Tukuaho, who was a cruel and arbitrary person, Fīnau Feletoa (Ulukālala II) was able to extend his authority to Haapai as well, which made him the most powerful chief of whole Tonga at that time. Yet it seems not to have been his intention to take Tongatapu too. It was sufficient for him just to keep the chiefs of that island away from interfering with his Haapai and Vavau. For that he was the main originator of the plan to murder the Tui Kanokupolu. With a triumvirate comprising him, Tupouniua and Tupoutoa the act was done in April 1799 during the yearly inasi (first-fruits offering) to the Tui Tonga in Mua.

Unfortunately this did not bring the peace he had hoped for, but started off a civil war in Tonga which would last for the next 50 years or so. Fīnau did not try to conquer Tongatapu, but limited himself to some raids on the island. The most severe one was against Tupoumālohi in his fortress of Nukualofa in 1807, in which the cannons he got from the Port au Prince were very useful. The writings of his protégé, William Mariner, go into great detail about these happenings and also the personality of this famous warlord.

He was also infamous, however, for the punishment he inflicted on some of his enemies: they were tied to leaking canoes, which were then set adrift at sea, soon to sink with their victims.

Fīnau Fangupō died in 1809 and was succeeded by his son Fīnau Ulukālala Moengangongo  who decided to cut all links with the troublesome Tongatapu and ordered that both Haapai and Vavau should pursue an isolationist policy. If it had not been for the coming of Tāufaāhau I, perhaps Tonga would have ended up as 3 independent nations. Moengangongo had died 2 years later, which is probably the reason that he has not gone into history as Ulukālala III

Tuapasi
Fīnau Ulukālala III, best known in history as Fīnau Ulukālala III i Pouono (the part of Neiafu where he would die), also named Tuapasi. He was the second son of Fīnau Fangupō and became Tui Vavau (Vavau king) in 1811, although it was not until 1820 before he got all the islands under control. When he died in March 1833 he ceded Vavau to his rearcousin and son in law Tāufaāhau I, as it was clear by then who was the most powerful person in Tonga. It was, after Haapai, the second island group of Tonga Tāufaāhau obtained in his way towards being king of all Tonga. It was therefore still in Vavau, in fact at Pouono, on 20 November 1839 that Tāufaāhau declared himself king of Tonga and ceded it then to the new Christian god.

Matekitonga
Tupou Toutai Nafetalai Matekitonga was the name of Fīnau Ulukālala IV, the only son of his father, born in the same year (1833) that the latter died. He grew up to be a vassal to Tāufaāhau, fought, for example, in 1853 with him and Cakobau against another Fijian chief, Mara Kapaiwai and was rewarded with the noble title of Ulukālala when Tāufaāhau, by then known as king Siaosi I, proclaimed the constitution in 1875 and abolished all old chiefly titles and subtitles, except for 20, who were elevated to noble status (and another 10 in 1880). From that time on the proper way to refer to these nobles is by their title only with, if needed, an identifying name between parenthesis after it.

Mīsini
His son Siaosi Fīnau Mīsini succeeded him on his death in 1877 as Fīnau Ulukālala V (Mīsini), and he fulfilled positions like governor of Vavau, several ministerial posts in the young Tongan government and was even regent. He died in 1938.

Haamea

The last of the dynasty was Siaosi Tangata-o-Haamea who became Ulukālala VI  (Haamea). As his mother's line died out without successors, he also was installed, later, with the noble title of Ata, from Kolovai. Around 1930 he was interested in marrying Fusipala, the half sister of queen Sālote Tupou. However, Sālote and her consort Tungī Mailefihi did not see this as a deference of the Vavau noble to the throne, but rather as a plot of him to break away from Tonga and to establish an independent Vavau kingdom. They refused. Fusipala died in 1933, unmarried. Siaosi fathered unmarried children and was later married to Amelia Tuna Kaimanu Vaea, they had one adopted daughter, Takukipulotu. The eldest of the unmarried children of 'Ulukalala Ha'amea was a son by the name of Sione Potauaine Kuliha'apai who married twice, his wives named Heu and Mele Liliola who both had issue. One of 'Ulukalala Ha'amea other unmarried children, a daughter by the name 'Eva, who married to noble Ve'ehala, and had issue.

Ahoeitu
Siaosi died on 12 September 1960 without a married son. The title Ulukālala, and Ata as well, were then taken away from the original heir by king Tāufaāhau Tupou IV. At the end both were given to the king's youngest son Ahoeitu Unuakiotonga Tukuaho (who already had the title Lavaka from Pea, and so ended up with 3 noble titles).

Siaosi Manumataongo
After the death of king Tāufaāhau Tupou IV and the accession of Siaosi Tupou V, Ahoeitu became the heir presumptive and had to give up, backdated to 11 September, the title in favour of his son, Siaosi Manumataongo Alaivahamamao Ahoeitu Konstantin Tukuaho, who was officially installed to it on 30 September 2006. In 2012 Ahoeitu became King and Siaosi Manumataongo became Crown Prince 'Ulukalala.

References

 J. Martin; An account of the natives of the Tonga islands; 1827; several time reprinted under the subtitle: Mariner's account.
 N. Rutherford; Friendly islands, a history of Tonga; 1977
 A. L. Kaeppler, M. Taumoefolau, N. Tukuʻaho, E. Wood-Ellem; Songs and poems of Queen Sālote; 2004; 

Tongan chiefs
History of Tonga
People from Vavaʻu